The Prince Becomes a Monk (Chinese: 玉龍太子出家 or 禪院鐘聲), sometimes known as Prince Yuk Loon and Azalea Tomb, is a 1963 Hong Kong Cantonese opera film directed by Chu Kei (珠璣). It stars Yam Kim-fai as the protagonist, Prince Yuk Loon.

Cast 

 Yam Kim-fai as Prince Yuk Loon
 Yu Lai-Zhen
 Chan Kam-tong
 Liang Tsi-pak
 Lee Heung-kam
 Lai Man
 Ma Siu-ying
 Ching Lai
 Cheung Sang

Reception 
Released for cinema on 20 February 1963, the film has received positive reception from critics. VCD was released in 2005 by CN Entertainment Ltd.

References

External links 
Li shi ying ye gong si Also called:Lai Si (Firm), From Library of Congress Name Authority File
Most widely held works by Lai Si (Firm), Classifications:PN1997, 791.4372
 

Hong Kong musical films
1963 films
Cantonese opera films
1960s Cantonese-language films